Octopus kermadecensis is a species of octopus in the genus Octopus. It is endemic to the Kermadec Islands. It was first described as Poypus kermadecnsis in 1914 from a female specimen, no male specimen was collected and described until 2011.

References

Cephalopods of Oceania
Endemic fauna of New Zealand
Endemic molluscs of New Zealand
Fauna of the Kermadec Islands
Molluscs described in 1914
Molluscs of New Zealand
Molluscs of the Pacific Ocean
Octopodidae
Taxa named by Samuel Stillman Berry